Malin Craig (August 5, 1875 – July 25, 1945) was a general in the United States Army who served as the 14th Chief of Staff of the United States Army from 1935 to 1939. He served in World War I and was recalled to active duty during World War II and, although he is mostly forgotten today, he played a very large role in preparing the U.S. Army for World War II.

Early life
Craig was born on August 5, 1875 in Saint Joseph, Missouri, a son of Army officer Louis A. Craig and Georgie (Malin) Craig. His siblings included Louis A. Craig. He entered the United States Military Academy (USMA) at West Point, New York on June 20, 1894. He graduated on April 26, 1898 and was ranked 33rd of 59. He was commissioned as a second lieutenant in the Infantry branch. Craig's initial assignment was to the 4th Infantry Regiment.

Early career
On June 23, 1898 Craig transferred to the Cavalry branch, and he was assigned to the 6th Cavalry Regiment during the Santiago Campaign, the United States invasion of Cuba during the Spanish–American War. After his return from Cuba, Craig transferred to the 4th Cavalry Regiment, serving in Wyoming and Oklahoma until 1900, when he served in the China Relief Expedition and in the Philippine Insurrection until 1902. He was promoted to first lieutenant on February 2, 1901, transferring back to the 6th Cavalry.

Craig attended the Infantry and Cavalry School from 1903 to 1904 and the Staff College from 1904 to 1905. He was promoted to captain on May 7, 1904, assigned to the 10th Cavalry Regiment and later the 1st Cavalry Regiment. Craig was garrisoned as a regimental quartermaster at Fort Clark in Kinney, Texas from 1906 to 1909. He would go on to graduate from the Army War College in 1910, where Hunter Liggett was among his classmates, and serve in a variety of administrative positions, most notable of which was assigning troops to their regiments.

He served with the 1st Cavalry Regiment in the western United States in 1912, then became an instructor at Fort Leavenworth, Kansas  Army Service Schools, where he served in 1916 and 1917. He transferred to the General Staff Corps in 1917.

World War I
Craig was promoted to major on May 15, 1917, shortly after the American entry into World War I. He was promoted to temporary lieutenant colonel on August 17 and temporary colonel on March 27, 1918.

Craig served in France during World War I as chief of staff to General Hunter Liggett in the 41st Division and later in I Corps, where he was promoted to temporary brigadier general on July 11, 1918. He then became chief of staff of the Third Army. He received the Army Distinguished Service Medal for his service during the war. His citation reads as follows:

Interwar period

After the war, Craig reverted to his permanent rank of major on August 15, 1919 but was promoted to colonel on July 1, 1920 and to brigadier general only 15 days later.

When Craig was promoted to colonel, he was put in command of the District of Arizona in 1920 and became the commandant of the Cavalry School from 1921 to 1923, after his promotion to brigadier general in April 1921. He served as Chief of Cavalry with the rank of major general from July 24, 1924 to March 20, 1926. He was succeeded by Herbert B. Crosby, after which he was assigned to command the Panama Canal Zone from 1 April 1928 to 30 August 1930.

Craig served as the commander of the Ninth Corps Area, headquartered in San Francisco, from 21 November 1930 to 24 January 1935.

Chief of Staff

Craig served as president of the Army War College in 1935, before being selected as Chief of Staff of the United States Army. He served as chief of staff from October 2, 1935 to August 31, 1939, succeeding General Douglas MacArthur and preceding George C. Marshall. That appointment carried with it a temporary promotion to full (four-star) general.

As Chief of Staff of the Army, Craig pointed out to Congress the army's lack of preparedness in manpower and material, stressed the necessity of lead time in military preparedness, focused attention on army planning, and, within governmental constraints, prepared the army for World War II. Craig, who opposed any mission for the Air Corps except that of supporting ground forces, also actively opposed the movement for a separate air force, and also refused to acknowledge the superiority of a four-engined bomber over all other types. This caused the cut back on planned purchases of B-17s to procure smaller but cheaper (and inferior) twin-engine light and medium bombers such as the Douglas B-18.

He retired, with the rank of general, on August 31, 1939 after forty-one years of active duty service. Upon his retirement, he received a second Distinguished Service Medal for his service as Army Chief of Staff.

World War II and death
Craig's retirement was short-lived, however. On September 26, 1941, with war on the horizon, he was recalled to active duty to head the War Department's Personnel Board, a body responsible for selecting individuals who were to receive direct commissions in the army. He headed the board until shortly before his death.

Craig died at Walter Reed Hospital in Washington, D.C. on July 25, 1945, where he had been ill for the previous year. He was posthumously awarded a third Distinguished Service Medal and was buried at Arlington National Cemetery.

Personal life
In April 1901, Craig married Genevieve Woodruff, a daughter of General Charles Woodruff. They were the parents of a son, Malin Craig Jr. (1902–1981).  Malin Craig Jr. was a career Army officer and World War II veteran who retired as a colonel. After his military retirement, he taught geometry in the public schools of Montgomery County, Maryland.

Awards

Dates of rank

References

Bibliography

 Official Register of the United States Army.  1945.  The Adjutant General.  Washington, D.C. p. 1135.

Further reading

"Craig, Malin". 1999. American National Biography. 5.

1875 births
1945 deaths
United States Army Infantry Branch personnel
United States Army Cavalry Branch personnel
People from St. Joseph, Missouri
United States Military Academy alumni
United States Army Command and General Staff College alumni
United States Army War College alumni
American military personnel of the Spanish–American War
American military personnel of the Philippine–American War
United States Army generals of World War II
United States Army generals
United States Army Chiefs of Staff
Recipients of the Distinguished Service Medal (US Army)
Commandeurs of the Légion d'honneur
Recipients of the Croix de Guerre 1914–1918 (France)
Honorary Companions of the Order of the Bath
Commanders of the Order of the Crown (Belgium)
Burials at Arlington National Cemetery
American military personnel of the Boxer Rebellion
United States Army generals of World War I